Wöyh! is a Finnish avant-garde rock duo founded in 2011 and made up of brothers Antti (Stam1na) and Jussi Hyyrynen (YUP). Antti writes most of the music whereas Jussi writes the lyrics. 

The band made its first live appearance in August 2012 at the Jurassic Rock music festival in Mikkeli, Finland. After the singles "Lokki" and "Hieho", the duo released their debut album Ikkillyk on 8 March 2013 on their own Kaskelotti Records label with distribution by Playground Music. Keyboardist Antti Pitkäjärvi and drummer Anssi Nykänen took part in the album. A third single "Kaskelotti" was released to coincide with the launch of the album.

Members
Antti Hyyrynen – vocals, bass
Jussi Hyyrynen – vocals, guitar

Discography

Albums

Singles
2011: Lokki (Seagull)
2012: Hieho (Heifer)
2013: Kaskelotti (Sperm Whale)
2015: Kamppailu merellä (Battle at Sea)
2015: Aarteenryöstäjä (Treasure Hunter/Tomb Raider)
2017: V4RHE
2017: Rapuarmeija (Crab Army)
2017: Kellonpurija (Watching the Watchers)
2017: Takaperoisten Kuiskausten Metsä (The Forest of Backward-Whispers)

References

External links
Official website

Finnish rock music groups
Musical groups established in 2011
Sibling musical duos
Finnish musical duos
2011 establishments in Finland